The Taifa of Murviedro and Sagunto was a medieval taifa kingdom that existed in a short period from 1086 to 1092.

List of Emirs

Lubbunid dynasty
Abu 'Isa Lubbun: 1086–1092

1092 disestablishments
States and territories established in 1086
Murviedro and Sagunto